The 2012–13 season was Livingston's second consecutive season in the First Division, having been promoted after winning the Scottish Second Division during season 2010–11. They also competed in the Challenge Cup, League Cup and the Scottish Cup.

Summary

Season
During season 2012–13 Livingston finished fourth in the Scottish First Division. They reached the first round of the Challenge Cup, the third round of the League Cup and the fourth round of the Scottish Cup.

Management
They began the season under the management of John Hughes. On 13 November 2012, Hughes left the club after only nine months in charge to take up the post of first team coach at Hartlepool United. Gareth Evans took over as interim manager following Hughes departure. At the end of November it was confirmed Evans would remain as manager on an ongoing basis.

On 28 February 2013, Evans was sacked by the club with Director of football John Collins resigning from his post. Richie Burke the club's youth development manager took charge of the first team in the interim. On 25 March, Burke was appointed as manager permanently with Mark Burchill joining the club as his assistant. The duo were given contracts until 2015, with Burchill also being registered as a player.

Results and fixtures

Pre season
A match against Rapid Bucharest, scheduled for 7 July, was called off due to a waterlogged pitch.

Scottish First Division

Scottish Challenge Cup

Scottish League Cup

Scottish Cup

Player statistics

Captains

Squad 
Last updated 6 May 2013

 

|}

Disciplinary record
Includes all competitive matches.
Last updated 6 May 2013

Team statistics

League table

Division summary

Transfers

Players in

Players out

References

Livingston
Livingston F.C. seasons